"Bottoms Up" is a song recorded by American country rock singer Brantley Gilbert. It is the first single from his third studio album Just as I Am, and was released on December 16, 2013.  The song was written by Gilbert, Justin Weaver and Brett James. A remix featuring Atlanta-based rapper T.I., was included on the reissue of Just as I Am.

Content
The song is a mid-tempo song with country rock influences. The song has the male narrator addressing his lover and offering to party with her by telling her, "tonight it's bottoms up."

Reception

Critical
Giving it 4 out of 5 stars, Markos Papadatos of Digital Journal wrote that "With this new song, he has shown maturity as both a vocalist and songwriter…'Bottoms Up' seems like a fun track for him to play at his live shows that will surely get the crowd excited." Matt Bjorke of Roughstock rated it 3.5 out of 5, saying that "If you like the sound of the stuff from Luke Bryan, Florida Georgia Line and Thomas Rhett, you’ll certainly enjoy 'Bottoms Up.' If you wanted the more ‘edgy’ rockin’ side to Brantley, this one certainly isn’t gonna be your kind of song. It’s certainly no 'Hell on Wheels' or 'Kick It in the Sticks' but it’s also not far removed vocally from 'More Than Miles.'"

Commercial
Released on December 16, 2013, the song premiered at the No. 1 spot at Country Digital Songs with 63,000 downloads sold. The song reached a million in sales in the U.S. by April 2014, and became the first million-selling song by Brantley Gilbert. The song was certified Platinum by RIAA on May 1, 2014. The song has sold 1,762,000 copies in the U.S. as of June 2015.

Music video
Shane Drake directed the music video. In it, Gilbert is dressed in 1930s apparel and surrounded by flappers while smuggling illegal moonshine.

Charts and certifications

Weekly charts

Year-end charts

Certifications

References 

2013 songs
2013 singles
Brantley Gilbert songs
Big Machine Records singles
Songs written by Brantley Gilbert
Songs written by Brett James
Song recordings produced by Dann Huff
Music videos directed by Shane Drake
Songs written by Justin Weaver